This is a list of listed buildings in the parish of Cambuslang in South Lanarkshire, Scotland.

List 

|}

Key

Notes

See also
 Buildings of Cambuslang 
 History of Cambuslang

References
 All entries, addresses and coordinates are based on data from Historic Scotland. This data falls under the Open Government Licence

External links
Listed Buildings in Cambuslang East Ward, South Lanarkshire at British Listed Buildings
Listed Buildings in Cambuslang West Ward, South Lanarkshire at British Listed Buildings

Cambuslang
Cambuslang
Rutherglen
 List
 List Cam